Joseph L. Tezanos (born José Tezanos, July 6, 1920 – March 21, 1985) was the first American of Hispanic descent to join the United States Coast Guard's reserve officer ranks.
During World War II Tezanos served as a gunner's mate aboard  during the invasions of Kiska, Alaska, Tarawa Atoll, Kwajalein Atoll, and in the Gilbert Islands.  For participation in ad hoc rescue efforts on May 21, 1944 following a devastating explosion of ammunition back at Pearl Harbor that earned him a Navy & Marine Corps Medal for distinguished heroism. It was following the receipt of this medal that Tezanos was sent to a four-month officer training school. Following his commissioning Tezanos spent a year as a junior officer aboard the transport USS Joseph T. Dickman.

He was demobilized in early 1946, attending college and graduate school.  Upon graduation he became a successful international businessman. Tezanos is interred at Arlington National Cemetery.

Legacy
Tezanos is the namesake of the Sentinel-class cutter .

References

External links
 

1920 births
1985 deaths
United States Coast Guard officers
Burials at Arlington National Cemetery
United States Coast Guard personnel of World War II
Recipients of the Navy and Marine Corps Medal
United States Coast Guard reservists
Spanish emigrants to the United States